The 1945 Holy Cross Crusaders football team represented the College of the Holy Cross in the 1945 college football season. The Crusaders were led by first-year head coach John "Ox" DaGrosa and played their home games at Fitton Field in Worcester, Massachusetts. They finished the regular season with a record of 8–1, ranked 16th in the AP Poll. Holy Cross was invited to the Orange Bowl, played on New Year's Day, where they lost to the University of Miami, 6–13. This was the first and only bowl game in Holy Cross's history.

Schedule

References

Holy Cross
Holy Cross Crusaders football seasons
Holy Cross Crusaders football